Linda Rogers is an American politician serving as a member of the Indiana Senate for Senate District 11. She assumed office on November 7, 2018.

Early life and education 
Rogers was born in Bad Axe, Michigan. She earned a Bachelor of Science degree in mathematics education from Central Michigan University.

Career 
After graduating from college, Rogers worked as a teacher. She has also owned and operated several businesses, including Lindy's Restaurant, Juday Creek Estates, Nugent Builders, and the Juday Creek Golf Course. Rogers also worked as the president of the National Golf Course Owners Association and the Indiana Home Builders Association. She was elected to the Indiana Senate in 2018. In 2022, Rogers authored an amendment to House Bill 1134 that would require school learning management systems and teaching materials more accessible to parents.

References 

Living people
Republican Party Indiana state senators
People from Bad Axe, Michigan
Central Michigan University alumni
Women state legislators in Indiana
People from Granger, Indiana
Year of birth missing (living people)